Odain Rose (born 19 July 1992 in Port Antonio, Jamaica) is a Jamaican-born Swedish athlete specialising in the sprinting events. His biggest success to date is the fifth place in the 60 metres at the 2013 European Indoor Championships.

Born in Jamaica, Odain moved to Sweden with his mother at the age of three.

Competition record

Personal bests
Outdoor
100 metres – 10.30 (+1.8 m/s) (Gothenburg 2014)
200 metres – 21.65 (+1.1 m/s) (Jessheim 2012)
Indoor
60 metres – 6.62 (Gothenburg 2013)

References

1992 births
Living people
People from Portland Parish
Swedish male sprinters
Jamaican male sprinters
Jamaican emigrants to Sweden
Swedish people of Jamaican descent
Sportspeople of Jamaican descent